Ayazabad (also Romanized as Ayāzābād; also known as Ayāzābād-e Kāsīān and Kāsīān-e Ayāzābād) is a village in Beyranvand-e Jonubi Rural District, Bayravand District, Khorramabad County, Lorestan Province, Iran. At the 2006 census, its population was 130, in 24 families.

References 

Towns and villages in Khorramabad County